SMS  was one of five  pre-dreadnought battleships built for the German  (Imperial Navy) between 1904 and 1906. Named after the German province of Silesia,  was laid down at the Schichau-Werke shipyard in Danzig on 19 November 1904, launched on 28 May 1906, and commissioned on 5 May 1908. The ships of her class were already outdated by the time they entered service, as they were inferior in size, armor, firepower, and speed to the revolutionary new British battleship .

After commissioning,  was assigned to I Battle Squadron of the High Seas Fleet, later being transferred to II Battle Squadron. She was primarily occupied with training cruises and fleet maneuvers in her early career. She served with the fleet throughout the first two years of World War I, seeing action at the Battle of Jutland on 31 May – 1 June 1916, where she was briefly actively engaged in combat. After Jutland, the Imperial Navy relegated  to guard duties before withdrawing her altogether in 1917, when she became a training ship. The Treaty of Versailles permitted the German navy to keep eight obsolete battleships, including , to defend the German coast. Initially kept in reserve, she was modernized in the mid-1920s and saw extensive service with the reorganized .

 saw limited combat during World War II, briefly bombarding Polish forces during the invasion of Poland in September 1939. She escorted minesweepers during Operation Weserübung, the invasion of Norway and Denmark in April 1940. After the operation, she was given secondary duties, primarily serving as a training ship and icebreaker. She ended her career providing fire support in the Baltic coast. While off Swinemünde on 3 May 1945, she struck a mine and was towed into Swinemünde, where she was sunk by her crew in shallow water, though much of her superstructure, including her main battery, remained above water. In the remaining days of the war,  used her anti-aircraft guns to defend the city from air attack. After the end of the war, she was broken up, though some parts of the ship remained visible until the 1970s.

Design 

The law secured funding for the construction of twenty new battleships over the next seventeen years. The first group, the five s, were laid down in the early 1900s. The -class ships were broadly similar to the s, but featured incremental improvements in armor protection. They also abandoned the gun turrets for the secondary battery guns, moving them back to traditional casemates to save weight. The British battleship armed with ten 12-inch (30.5 cm) gunswas commissioned in December 1906. Dreadnoughts revolutionary design rendered every capital ship of the German navy obsolete, including .

In addition to being the fastest ship of her class,  was the most fuel efficient. She had a standard crew of 35 officers and 708 enlisted men.

The ship's primary primary armament of four 28 cm SK L/40 guns in two twin turrets; one turret was placed forward and the other aft. Her offensive armament was rounded out with a secondary battery of fourteen  SK L/40 guns mounted individually in casemates. A battery of twenty-two  SK L/45 guns in single mounts provided defense against torpedo boats. The ship was fitted with six  torpedo tubes, all submerged in the hull. One was in the bow, one in the stern, and four on the broadside. The main battery turrets had  sides.

Service history 
The contracts for the last two members of the  class, ordered under the contract names "R" and "Q", were awarded on 11 June 1904. "R" was laid down on 19 November at the Schichau dockyard in Danzig. She was launched on 28 May 1906, at which time Duchess Mathilde of Pless christened her  after the province of Silesia. A shipyard crew took the ship from Danzig to Kiel in March 1908 for her final fitting-out.  was commissioned into the fleet on 5 May. She then began sea trials, which were delayed from 6 July to 5 September when the ship was temporarily used as a torpedo testing ship in place of the protected cruiser , which had to go into drydock for an overhaul. By early September,  had completed her overhaul, allowing  to join the fleet. She received her full crew on 22 September and thereafter joined I Battle Squadron.

The ships of the High Seas Fleet embarked on a cruise into the Atlantic Ocean that lasted from 7 July to 1 August. While on the way back to Germany, they were received by the British Royal Navy in Spithead. In late 1909, Admiral Henning von Holtzendorff became the new fleet commander. His tenure as fleet commander was marked by strategic experimentation, due to the threat the latest underwater weapons posed, and the fact that the new s were too wide to pass through the Kaiser Wilhelm Canal. Accordingly, the fleet was transferred from Kiel to Wilhelmshaven on 1 April 1910. In May 1910, the fleet conducted training maneuvers in the Kattegat. These were in accordance with Holtzendorff's strategy, which envisioned drawing the Royal Navy into the narrow waters there. The annual summer cruise was to Norway, and was followed by fleet training, during which another fleet review was held in Danzig on 29 August. A training cruise into the Baltic Sea took place at the end of the year.

In March 1911, the fleet conducted exercises in the Skagerrak and Kattegat.  and the rest of the fleet received British and American naval squadrons at Kiel in June and July. The year's autumn maneuvers were confined to the Baltic and the Kattegat, during which another fleet review was held in order to prepare for an Austro-Hungarian delegation that included Archduke Franz Ferdinand and Admiral Rudolf Montecuccoli. On 3 November 1911,  was transferred to II Battle Squadron with the rest of her sister ships; at this time, she transferred back to Kiel, where II Squadron was based. In mid-1912, due to the Agadir Crisis, the summer cruise was confined to the Baltic, to avoid exposing the fleet during the period of heightened tension with Britain and France. The fleet thereafter held the annual autumn maneuvers in August and September. A winter cruise in the Baltic followed at the end of the year. In 1913 the same uneventful pattern followed. On 14 July 1914, the annual summer cruise to Norway began. The threat of war during the July Crisis forced Kaiser Wilhelm II to end the cruise after only two weeks; by the end of July the fleet was back in port.

World War I 
 served with the High Seas Fleet through the first two years of the war. At the outbreak of the conflict, the ship was deployed to guard the German Bight. She then rejoined the High Seas Fleet to support the battlecruisers that bombarded Scarborough, Hartlepool, and Whitby on 15–16 December 1914. During the operation, the German battle fleet of 12 dreadnoughts and 8 pre-dreadnoughts came to within  of an isolated squadron of six British battleships. Skirmishes between the rival destroyer screens convinced Admiral Friedrich von Ingenohl that he was confronted with the entire Grand Fleet, and so he broke off the engagement and went back home. Two fruitless fleet advances followed on 17–18 and 21–23 April 1915. Another followed on 17–18 May, and another on 23–24 October. In March 1916,  was employed as a target ship for U-boats. On 24–25 April,  and her sisters joined the dreadnoughts of the High Seas Fleet to support the battlecruisers of I Scouting Group on a raid of the English coast. While en route to the target, the battlecruiser  was damaged by a mine. The remaining battlecruisers conducted a short bombardment of the ports of Yarmouth and Lowestoft. The target's visibility was poor, so the operation was soon called off before the British fleet could intervene. Squadron exercises in the Baltic followed from 11 to 22 May.

Battle of Jutland 

Admiral Scheer immediately planned another foray into the North Sea, but the damage to  delayed the operation until the end of May.  was the second ship in IV Division of II Battle Squadron under the command of Rear Admiral , positioned at the rear of the German line. During the ensuing operation,  was the second to last ship in the German line, followed only by her sister ship . During the "Run to the North", Admiral Reinhard Scheer, the commander of the fleet, ordered the fleet to pursue the British V Battle Squadron at top speed. The slower -class ships could not keep up with the faster dreadnoughts and quickly fell behind. By 19:30, the Grand Fleet had arrived on the scene and confronted Scheer with a large numerical superiority. The German fleet was severely hampered by the presence of the slower -class ships; if Scheer ordered an immediate turn towards Germany, he would have to sacrifice the slower ships to make good his escape.

As they had fallen behind, the ships of IIBattle Squadron could not conform to the new course following the turn.  and the other five ships of the squadron were, therefore, located on the disengaged side of the German line. Mauve considered moving his ships to the rear of the line, astern of IIIBattle Squadron dreadnoughts, but decided against it when he realized the movement would interfere with the maneuvering of Admiral Franz von Hipper's battlecruisers. Instead, he attempted to place his ships at the head of the line.

Later on the first day of the battle, the hard-pressed battlecruisers of I Scouting Group were being pursued by their British opponents.  and the other so-called "five-minute ships" came to their aid by steaming in between the opposing battlecruiser squadrons.  and her sisters could barely make out a target in the darkness. Owing to the poor visibility their shooting was ineffective. The British battlecruisers scored several hits on the German ships; in the brief melee a near miss from a large-caliber gun sprayed shell splinters onto 's decks, killing one man and wounding another. Admiral Mauve ordered an 8-point turn to the south, and the British did not follow.

British destroyers conducted a series of attacks against the fleet, some of which targeted . Regardless, the High Seas Fleet punched through the British destroyer forces and reached Horns Reef by 04:00 on 1 June.

Later wartime service
After Jutland,  and her three surviving sisters returned to picket duty at the mouth of the Elbe, and in June and July  again served as a torpedo target ship for U-boats. The experience at Jutland demonstrated that pre-dreadnoughts had no place in a naval battle with dreadnoughts, and they were thus left behind when the High Seas Fleet sortied again on 18 August. From 31 January to 9 February 1917, she served in the Danish straits as a guard ship, and also as an icebreaker, after which she returned to the Elbe. From 2 May to 8 June, she was again used as a target ship in the Baltic. Her guard ship duties in the Elbe ended on 27 July, when she was withdrawn from service and converted into a training ship for engine room personnel and new recruits. She served in this capacity from 20 August to 16 April 1918.

She had made several training cruises in the Baltic by November 1918; she was in Kiel during the Kiel mutiny in the closing days of the war. He and the crew remained aboard, and on 14 November they took the ship back to Kiel, where they were released from service on 20 November. She was used briefly again to train cadets to operate boilers and engines; on 1 December, she was again removed from service.

Inter-war years 

Following the German defeat in World War I, the German navy was reorganized as the  according to the Treaty of Versailles. The new navy was permitted to retain eight pre-dreadnought battleships under Article 181—two of which would be in reserve—for coastal defense.  was one of the vessels retained under the terms of the treaty, but was initially kept in reserve, since she still carried the battery of just 10.5 cm and 8.8 cm guns. The replacements for the old battleships—the s—would not be ready for some time, and so the navy decided to rearm and modernize  in 1926–1927. Her original 28 cm guns were reinstalled, and a new secondary battery of  guns were installed in the casemates for the old 17 cm guns. This included removing the fore funnel and ducting those boilers into an enlarged funnel, and installing a new heavy pole mast.

On joining the rest of the fleet,  became the flagship of the Commander of the Naval Forces of the North Sea,  (KAdm—Rear Admiral) Alexander Werth, which was renamed on 1 January 1930 the Commander of Battleships. She was based in Wilhelmshaven. In May 1927, President Paul von Hindenburg came to Wilhelmshaven to visit the fleet. The annual fleet maneuvers were conducted in August and September, as they had been in the prewar years, and they culminated in a naval review on 14 September for Hindenburg. KAdm Wilhelm Prentzel replaced Werth on 29 September and in October 1928 he was in turn replaced by KAdm Walther Franz. In the course of 1928,  went on a fleet cruise in the Atlantic in July and conducted shooting training in August with the old ironclad, now target ship, . Another Atlantic cruise followed in April and May 1929. From 3 April to 6 June,  embarked on a major training cruise by herself to the Mediterranean Sea, during which she visited Messina, Sicily, where her senior officers met King Victor Emmanuel III of Italy.

In June 1931,  visited Norway. On 10 December 1933, the new heavy cruiser  replaced  as the flagship of the Commander of Battleships.  was converted back into a training ship for cadets between 18 February and 8 April 1935, and she was formally removed from the fleet organization on 30 September. Among the modifications were the installation of additional anti-aircraft guns and replacement of the ship's boilers. The newer boilers were more efficient, which allowed fewer of them to be used; the additional space this created was used as crew compartments for the cadets and an instruction room. The crew was also altered; the standard crew had been 35 officers and 708 enlisted men; after the conversion, this was reduced to 29 officers and 559 sailors, supplemented by 214 cadets. Over the course of the following three years,  embarked on several overseas training cruises as part of the Training Inspectorate. The first lasted from 1 December 1935 to 29 February 1936, and went to Cape Verde in the central Atlantic. More modernization work was done after her return to Germany, and from 12 October 1936 to 22 April 1937, she went on a tour of North, Central, and South America. Further cruises followed in October 1937, April 1938, and March 1939. During this period, her last coal-fired boilers were replaced with oil-fired models.

World War II 

After the outbreak of World War II following the German invasion of Poland on 1 September 1939,  initially remained in her training ship role, though from 21 to 27 September she was used to bombard Polish artillery positions around Hel and Jastarnia. After the operation,  had six of her 15 cm guns removed to arm the new surface raider . She then returned to training ship duties, and from January to March 1940 served as an icebreaker to allow U-boats to operate. She then escorted minesweepers in the Little Belt in April during Operation Weserübung, the invasion of Norway and Denmark. She resumed training duties, but crew shortages forced the navy to deactivate the ship on 2 August, leaving only a skeleton crew aboard to maintain the ship's condition. In January 1941, she was reactivated to again serve as an icebreaker in the Baltic until 31 March, when she was again decommissioned in Gotenhafen, thereafter being used as a stationary training hulk with a skeleton crew.

The Soviet fleet did not attempt to leave port after Germany invaded in June, and so  was detached from the force guarding the minefields in October. She returned to Gotenhafen and resumed training duties there. Icebreaker service again summoned the vessel to active service from January to April 1942. On 4 April,  sailed back to Gotenhafen in company with the battleship  and the icebreaker .  thereafter saw limited training duties in the Baltic in 1943 and 1944, owing to the increasingly limited supplies of fuel oil available to Germany by this stage in the war. During this period, her armament was revised several times. In 1943, a pair of twin  anti-aircraft guns were installed, one on each side of her bridge.

In early 1944, her anti-aircraft armament was strengthened considerably with the addition of two 40 mm guns and twenty  guns; these were in two  quadruple, and six twin mounts. Further enhancements were made later in the year, including with the installation of four heavy 10.5 cm anti-aircraft guns in place of the old 8.8 cm guns atop her after superstructure and two more of the guns abreast her bridge, these taking the place of the 37 mm guns, which were removed. The light anti-aircraft battery increased to seven or ten 40 mm guns in single and double mounts and eighteen or twenty-two 20 mm guns in double and quadruple mounts (sources differ on the exact number of guns).  was also equipped with a FuMO-25 search radar and a FuMB-6 radar detection set, both of which were installed on the foremast.

She was moved from Danzig to Gotenhafen and then to Sopot from 15 to 21 March 1945 to provide gunfire support to German forces in the area. She was then used to carry more than 1,000 wounded soldiers from Sopot to Swinemünde, where she also restocked her ammunition. She then remained in the port to shell the advancing Soviet 2nd Shock Army. On 2 May, she was ordered to protect the  bridge that connected Wolgast and the island of Usedom. Early on the morning of 3 May, while steaming south of Greifswalder Oie, she struck a British air-dropped naval mine; the explosion killed two men and caused significant flooding. She was taken under tow by the destroyer  back to Swinemünde, where her anti-aircraft guns could be used to help defend the city. The crew scuttled the ship there in shallow water so she could not be sunk by air attack and risk capsizing. Between 1949 and 1956, the wreck was demolished and then scrapped in situ by an East German company. Some remains from the ship were still visible in 1970.

Footnotes

Notes

Citations

References

Further reading

External links 

 SMS Schlesien in MaritimeQuest – Schlesiens gallery, including a photograph in the role of icebreaker

Deutschland-class battleships
Ships built in Danzig
1906 ships
World War I battleships of Germany
Battleships of the Kriegsmarine
World War II battleships of Germany
World War II shipwrecks in the Baltic Sea
Maritime incidents in May 1945
Ships built by Schichau
Ships sunk by mines